is a Japanese former child actress who was affiliated with Horipro.  She is best known for her role as Yuki Fukushima in the 2004 film Nobody Knows.

Selected filmography 
 Nobody Knows (2004)
 Train Man (2005)
 God's Left Hand, Devil's Right Hand (2006)

References

External links 
 

1997 births
Living people
21st-century Japanese actresses
Actresses from Tokyo
Japanese child actresses
Japanese film actresses